Dungmaed Gewog (Dzongkha: གདུང་སྨད་) (also called Dungme and Dungmin) is a gewog (village block) of Pemagatshel District, Bhutan.

References

External links 
https://web.archive.org/web/20100503060847/http://www.pemagatshel.gov.bt/gewogDetail.php?id=48

Gewogs of Bhutan
Pemagatshel District